Logistics Management is a trade publication and web site serving the information needs of the field of logistics and transportation.

History and profile
Established in 1962, Logistics Management magazine is published monthly. Special reports, like the Logistics Outlook in January and the Buyers Guide in December, are provided on an annual basis.

Reed Business Information closed Logistics Management on April 16, 2010. On April 23, Reed sold its closed Supply Chain publications to a new company, Peerless Media, formed by Brian Ceraolo, former Group Publisher. The publisher and president of Peerless Media is Brian Ceraolo. The chief editor is Michael Levans, with the editorial offices located in Framingham, Massachusetts, USA.

As of December 2013, total BPA audited circulation was 70,074 subscribers.

References

BPA Worldwide

External links
 Logistics Management website
Peerless Media LLC buys The Supply Chain Group

Monthly magazines published in the United States
Business magazines published in the United States
Magazines established in 1962
Packaging magazines and journals
Professional and trade magazines
Waltham, Massachusetts
Magazines published in Massachusetts
1962 establishments in Massachusetts